The 2002–03 North Carolina Tar Heels men's basketball team represented the University of North Carolina at Chapel Hill during the 2002–03 NCAA Division I men's basketball season. Their head coach was Matt Doherty. The team captains for this season were Jonathan Holmes and Will Johnson.  The team played its home games in the Dean Smith Center in Chapel Hill, North Carolina as a member of the Atlantic Coast Conference.

Roster

Schedule and results

The Tar Heels' preseason began with their annual Blue-White Scrimmage.  The attendance at the scrimmage was 14,125 people, the most people at one of the Blue-White Scrimmages at that time.

In between their run in the Preseason NIT, the Tar Heels played, and won, in the first game held in Old Dominion University's Ted Constant Convocation Center.

The Tar Heels would go on to win that season's Preseason NIT, defeating Kansas, then ranked number two in the AP Poll, and Stanford in the process.  By the time the Tar Heels won over Stanford, they had their best start to a season since the 1998-99 season, when the Tar Heels started out with an 8-0 record.

The Tar Heels didn't fare as well in the ECAC Holiday Festival, getting upset by Iona in the first game.  Iona's win against the Tar Heels was the first time Iona won over a ranked team in 23 years.  The Tar Heels recovered in the second game, winning against St. John's.  After the ECAC Holiday Festival, the Tar Heels would not appear in any other AP Polls that season.

In addition to the first game held at the Constant Center, the Tar Heels played the first game at what was then known as the University of Miami's Convocation Center.  That game ended in an overtime loss for the Tar Heels.

Several records involving three-point attempts were set this season.  Thirty-five three-point attempts were made in the game against Davidson, setting a program record of three-point attempts made in a single game.  The Tar Heels would come close to matching that record later that season against Wake Forest in the Dean Smith Center and Clemson at Littlejohn Coliseum.  Eight hundred and twenty two three-point goals were attempted and 290 three-point goals were attempted this season, both program-high records.

The 40-point margin in the away game at Maryland became the third largest margin of defeat in the program's history, after a 43-point loss against Lynchburg Elks in 1915 and a 42-point loss against Kentucky in 1950.

Despite a winning record at the start of this season, the Tar Heels finished conference play with a 6–10 record.  The Tar Heels needed a win in the 2003 ACC men's basketball tournament to advance to the NCAA Division I men's basketball tournament.    The Tar Heels fell short of this goal, defeating Maryland in the quarterfinals but falling to Duke in the semifinals.

The Tar Heels' then 17–15 record was good enough for the 2003 National Invitation Tournament.  After defeating DePaul and Wyoming, the Tar Heels would fall to Georgetown in the quarterfinals with a 19–16 record.

The 16 losses in this season were the second most losses in the program's history at the time.  The record would be broken by the 2009-10 season with 17 losses.  The losses occurring in the 2009-10 season and this season are second and third, respectfully, to the program's loss record set in the previous season.

Days after the end of the Tar Heels' NIT campaign, Doherty resigned as head coach on April 1, 2003.  On April 14, 2003, Roy Williams would become the next head coach of the Tar Heels men's basketball team.

|-
!colspan=12 style="background:#56A0D3; color:#FFFFFF;"| ACC Tournament

|-
!colspan=12 style="background:#56A0D3; color:#FFFFFF;"| NIT

References

North Carolina Tar Heels men's basketball seasons
North Carolina
North Carolina
2002 in sports in North Carolina
2003 in sports in North Carolina